Edward Jones (died 6 May 1590) was a Welsh martyr of the Roman Catholic Church. He has been beatified in 1926 with the other Douai Martyrs.

Life
He was born in Llanelidan in Dyffryn Clwyd. He was baptised an Anglican in the Diocese of St Asaph. He travelled around Europe, and during his travels he became a Catholic.

In 1587, in Reims, he was received into the Catholic Church. He studied to be a priest at Douai College. On 11 June 1588, he was ordained a priest in Loon. In December 1588, he returned to England and stayed for some time in a grocer's shop in Fleet Street.

In 1590, he was arrested in that shop by Richard Topcliffe, "who pretended to be a Catholic." He was taken to the Tower of London and tortured there. At the Old Bailey "he made a skillful and learned defense, pleading that a confession elicited under torture was not legally sufficient to ensure a conviction. The court complimented him on his courageous bearing". Nevertheless, he was convicted of high treason. Together with Anthony Middleton, he was hanged, drawn and quartered on 6 May 1590, opposite the grocer’s shop where he had been captured; "over the gallows there was placed an inscription: 'For treason and favouring of foreign invasion'. When he [Jones] protested he was thrown off the scaffold ... and the butchery began".

Beatification 
He was beatified on 15 December 1929; his feast day is 6 May.

See also
 Blessed Edward Jones Catholic High School
 Catholic Church in the United Kingdom

References

Further reading
 

16th-century births
1590 deaths
Converts to Roman Catholicism from Anglicanism
Welsh beatified people
People executed under Elizabeth I by hanging, drawing and quartering
16th-century Roman Catholic martyrs
16th-century venerated Christians
People executed under the Tudors for treason against England
16th-century Welsh clergy
Executed Welsh people
One Hundred and Seven Martyrs of England and Wales